Janowiczki may refer to the following places in Poland:
Janowiczki, Lower Silesian Voivodeship (south-west Poland)
Janowiczki, Lesser Poland Voivodeship (south Poland)
Janowiczki, Pomeranian Voivodeship (north Poland)